United Nations Security Council Resolution 389, adopted on April 22, 1976, reaffirmed the right of the people of East Timor to self-determination. The Council called upon all states to respect the territorial integrity of East Timor and upon the Government of Indonesia to withdraw all of its forces from the Territory. The Resolution then asks the Secretary-General to have his Special Representative pursue consultations with the parties concerned and that the Secretary-General follow the implementation of the resolution and submit a report to the Council as soon as possible. The Council goes on to call upon all states and parties to cooperate fully with the United Nations to achieve a peaceful solution and facilitate the decolonization of the territory.

The resolution was adopted with 12 votes to none, with Japan and the United States abstaining. Benin did not participate in the voting.

See also
 History of East Timor
 Indonesian invasion of East Timor
 Indonesian occupation of East Timor
 List of United Nations Security Council Resolutions 301 to 400 (1971–1976)

References
Text of the Resolution at undocs.org

External links
 

 0389
United Nations operations in East Timor
 0389
 0389
April 1976 events